In November 1935, workers of the Vermont Marble Company went on strike. The action attracted national attention and ended in early 1936 through arbitration.

References 

 
 
 
 
 
 
 https://books.google.com/books?id=uTBCXqOou0YC&pg=PA304
 https://books.google.com/books?id=bNqUDwAAQBAJ&pg=PA23
 https://www.burlingtonfreepress.com/story/news/local/2014/03/23/history-of-vermont-strikes-include-dynamite-sabotage-and-politics/6706997/

1935 labor disputes and strikes
Proctor, Vermont
Labor disputes in Vermont